ButanGas is one of the largest liquefied petroleum gas distributor in Europe. Founded in Milan, Italy in 1948 by Italian-Romanian entrepreneur Iosif Constantin Drăgan, now the company has operations in Europe and the Maghreb. The company also owns some oil tankers and a publishing house in Romania.

See also
Official Website

Oil and gas companies of Italy
Companies based in Milan
Non-renewable resource companies established in 1948